Anoplodesmus stadelmanni, is a species of millipedes in the family Paradoxosomatidae. It is endemic to Sri Lanka.

References

Polydesmida
Animals described in 1930
Endemic fauna of Sri Lanka
Millipedes of Asia